Sophia Lucia (born ) is an American dancer. Described as a "phenom" by multiple media publications, she holds the Guinness World Record for most consecutive pirouettes. She is also known for her appearance on the reality television show Dance Moms.

Early life
Sophia Lucia was born in 2002 or 2003 to mother Jackie Lucia. She is from Poway, California, United States. She began dancing at the age of two at San Diego Dance Centre, which is owned by her cousin Kristen Hibbs. Lucia moved to Arizona to train in ballet. She joined Phoenix's Master Ballet Academy in 2015 or 2016. She has also danced at Phoenix Ballet as a volunteer.

Career
In January 2012, a video of Lucia performing 40 turns was uploaded to YouTube. It went viral, garnering over 800,000 views by February 2013. The video was also sent to The Ellen DeGeneres Show. Her mother recalled that a representative "called back in a week and said, 'We have to have her on the show. Lucia performed a tap dance in the "hidden talent" portion of a February 2012 episode. She also briefly made an appearance in the reality television series Dance Moms as one of Abby Lee Miller's "replacement" dancers. In 2013, Lucia broke the Guinness World Record for most consecutive pirouettes at age 10 after completing 55 turns, surpassing Alicia Clifton's record of 36. The following year, she was named the Junior Female Best Dancer at the Dance Awards in New York City. At age 13, she portrayed the Harlequin Doll in Phoenix Ballet's production of The Nutcracker at Orpheum Theatre. In a review, Kerry Lengel of AZCentral said she played the role "with humor and aplomb".

Public image
Multiple media publications have described Lucia as a "phenom". According to the magazine Dance Spirit, Lucia's rapid rise to fame was due to her "top-notch technique and unreal flexibility", as well as her appearance on Dance Moms. Her ballet teacher Rachel Sebastian stated that she exhibits the "perfect storm" of natural talent and tenacity that helps her turn well. Lengel partially credited the popularity of Phoenix Ballet's The Nutcracker to Lucia and her fame from reality television.

Credits

Awards

References

External links

2000s births
Living people
21st-century American ballet dancers
American ballerinas
American tap dancers
Participants in American reality television series
People from Poway, California
So You Think You Can Dance (American TV series) contestants
World record holders